Joseph Cucchiara (郭怡雅) was born in Sicily, Italy in 1889. He joined Salesians of Don Bosco in 1907. After the outbreak of World War I, he followed the armies and served in hospitals.

He was delegated to the diocese of Shiu Chow of Kwangtung in 1911. He worked hard and founded many churches and schools in the area. After communists came to the area, most of these structures were in hand of communists. He was then sent to work in Aberdeen Technical School in Hong Kong. At the meantime, he helped the sisters of Sisters Announcers of the Lord from Shiu Chow to Hong Kong.  He dedicated much effort to help the sisters open Tak Nga Primary School and Tak Nga Secondary School. He died in Canossa Hospital on 18 December 1966 and buried in Happy Valley, Hong Kong.

The sisters from Sisters Announcers of the Lord founded a school on Tsing Yi Island and named it Father Cucchiara Memorial School to memorise his contribution.

1889 births
1966 deaths
Roman Catholic Diocese of Hong Kong
Date of birth missing
Place of birth missing
Clergy from Sicily
20th-century Italian Roman Catholic priests